is Japanese singer-songwriter Ua's second re-cut single and sixth overall, released on November 21, 1996. It debuted with 5,920 copies sold at #73 on the Oricon Weekly Singles Chart. The single includes a cover of Patti Smith Group's "Because the Night".

Track listing

CD

Vinyl

Charts and sales

References

External links
 SPEEDSTAR RECORDS | UA 「雲がちぎれる時」

1996 singles
Ua (singer) songs
1996 songs